ANT Fresco was a proprietary, embedded web browser produced by ANT Software Limited, a software development firm headquartered in Cambridge, United Kingdom. Fresco was superseded by Galio in 2004.

As an embedded web browser, Fresco was quite attractive due to its low hardware requirements. One of the first mainstream devices that used the Fresco web browser was the Prismiq Media Player released in 2003, and which featured 64 MB of RAM and a RISC CPU. The Prismiq media player received awards from print publications Financial Times and PC Magazine along with the website CNET.  It supported HTML 4.01, JavaScript 1.3, optionally Macromedia Flash Player 5, SSL security, and antialiased fonts. IPTV tuners is another market niche where ANT's Fresco web browser has been used. By late 2006, ANT announced that Pace Micro Technology shipped its one millionth TV set-top box including its Fresco web browser.

The version of the Fresco browser as included in the Prismiq Media Player lacked support for AJAX and modern JavaScript.  ANT addressed these shortcomings in ANT Galio, launched in 2004.

References

External links
ANT Software Limited Homepage

Web browsers
Discontinued web browsers
1994 software